Errict Undra Rhett (born December 11, 1970) is an American former professional football player who was a running back in the National Football League (NFL) for seven seasons during the 1990s and early 2000s. Rhett played college football for the University of Florida, and was recognized as an All-American. A second-round pick in the 1994 NFL Draft, he played professionally for the Tampa Bay Buccaneers, Baltimore Ravens and Cleveland Browns of the NFL.

Early life
Rhett was born in Pembroke Pines, Florida in 1970. He attended McArthur High School in Hollywood, Florida, where he was a star high school football player for the McArthur Mustangs. He also was a two-time state wrestling champion in the 185-pound and 220-pound weight class for the McArthur Mustangs wrestling team.
At the 1988 Wrestling State Championship, Rhett did not meet the qualifications to wrestle at the 220lbs weight class because he only weighed 173lbs. In order to wrestle 220lbs, all wrestlers must weigh a minimum of 185lbs. Rhett sprinted across the street to a 7-Eleven, only to return 1:30 minutes later and stepped on the scale weighing 186lbs. Rhett went on to capture his 1st State Championship. When the media asked Rhett how did he gain that much weight in that short period of time, Rhett simply said " What the mind can conceive the body will achieve".

College career
Rhett accepted an athletic scholarship to attend the University of Florida in Gainesville, Florida, and played tailback for coach Steve Spurrier's Florida Gators football team from 1990 to 1993. Rhett broke Gator alumnus Emmitt Smith's former Gators career rushing record, finishing with 4,163 yards and thirty-four touchdowns, 1,230 yards receiving and two touchdown receptions, and leading the Gators in rushing for all four seasons of his college career. Memorably, he rushed for 193 yards against the Kentucky Wildcats in 1992, and for 196 yards against the Auburn Tigers in 1993. Aided by his consistent running game, the Gators won the Southeastern Conference (SEC) championship in 1991 and again in 1993. As a senior team captain, Rhett was named most valuable player (MVP) of the 1994 Sugar Bowl, rushing for 105 yards and three touchdowns in the Gators' 41–7 victory over the West Virginia Mountaineers. He was a first-team All-SEC selection in 1991 and 1993, a first-team All-American in 1993, and was chosen by his teammates as the Gators' most valuable player in 1993.

During his time at Florida, Rhett was initiated as a brother of Omega Psi Phi fraternity. He graduated from Florida with a bachelor's degree in 1995, and was later inducted into the University of Florida Athletic Hall of Fame as a "Gator Great" in 2005. The sports editors of The Gainesville Sun ranked him as No. 34 among the 100 all-time greatest Gators of the first 100 seasons of Florida football in 2006.

Professional career
During his rookie season with Tampa Bay, he rushed for 1,011 yards and seven touchdowns. Rhett had a career year the following season when he rushed for 1,207 yards and eleven touchdowns. He was involved in a contract hold-out before the  season, but still led the Buccaneers in rushing despite appearing in just nine games. Rhett played four more years in the NFL, but he never matched the numbers that he produced during his first two seasons. His best post-Tampa Bay season came in  when he rushed for 852 yards for the Baltimore Ravens. Rhett's career ended when the Cleveland Browns waived him immediately before the start of the  season.

During his seven NFL seasons, Rhett rushed for 4,143 yards and twenty-nine touchdowns; he also had eighty-nine receptions for 552 yards and three touchdowns.

Life after football
Rhett is the father of three children: son Errict, Jr., and daughters Morgan and Amaurri. All three are actively involved in sports; he coaches his son's Optimist league junior football team and regularly attends his daughters' track meets.

When his playing career ended after the 2000 NFL season, Rhett returned to South Florida, where he grew up. Today, he is the chief executive officer of Errict Rhett Custom Homes and the Errict Rhett Foundation. Rhett's foundation emphasizes charitable activities that benefit underprivileged children, including an after-school support program, college scholarships, and a mentoring program.

See also

 History of the Tampa Bay Buccaneers
 List of Florida Gators football All-Americans
 List of Florida Gators in the NFL Draft
 List of Omega Psi Phi brothers
 List of University of Florida alumni
 List of University of Florida Athletic Hall of Fame members

References

Bibliography
 Carlson, Norm, University of Florida Football Vault: The History of the Florida Gators, Whitman Publishing, LLC, Atlanta, Georgia (2007). .
 Golenbock, Peter, Go Gators! An Oral History of Florida's Pursuit of Gridiron Glory, Legends Publishing, LLC, St. Petersburg, Florida (2002). .
 Hairston, Jack, Tales from the Gator Swamp: A Collection of the Greatest Gator Stories Ever Told, Sports Publishing, LLC, Champaign, Illinois (2002). .
 McCarthy, Kevin M., Fightin' Gators: A History of University of Florida Football, Arcadia Publishing, Mount Pleasant, South Carolina (2000). .
 Nash, Noel, ed., The Gainesville Sun Presents The Greatest Moments in Florida Gators Football, Sports Publishing, Inc., Champaign, Illinois (1998). .

1970 births
Living people
All-American college football players
American football running backs
Baltimore Ravens players
Cleveland Browns players
Florida Gators football players
People from Pembroke Pines, Florida
Players of American football from Florida
Tampa Bay Buccaneers players